29 Persei is a single star in the northern constellation of Perseus, located approximately 640 light years away from the Sun based on parallax. It is visible to the naked eye as faint, blue-white hued star with an apparent visual magnitude of 5.16. This object is a member of the Alpha Persei Cluster.

This is a B-type main-sequence star with a stellar classification of B3 V. During the 1930s it was reported to have a variable radial velocity, but that may instead have been due to instrument error. The star has a high rate of spin, showing a projected rotational velocity of 120 km/s. It has 6.8 times the mass of the Sun and about 3.9 times the Sun's radius. 29 Persei is radiating 960 times the Sun's luminosity from its photosphere at an effective temperature of 16,143 K.

References

B-type main-sequence stars
Alpha Persei Cluster
Perseus (constellation)
BD+49 899
Persei, 29
020365
015404
0987